SC Gače Ski Resort (formerly the Bela Ski Resort) is a family Slovenian ski resort in the Municipality of Semič on Mount Pogorelec. The closest city is Novo Mesto. It is near the Croatian border. The resort offers 8 km of ski slopes with various difficulty and 6.5 km of cross-country skiing (2 tracks). There are also a sledding slope, a hiking path, and a mountain biking trail in the summer.

Accommodation 
Neither the nearest village Črmošnjice has accommodation capacities nor the Ski resort, but in the nearby SPA town of Dolenjske Toplice (12 km away) there are some Hotels and a waterpark.

Ski lifts

Ski slopes

External links
 SC Gače website - official site

Ski areas and resorts in Slovenia